= Saintie =

Indo-Persian spear

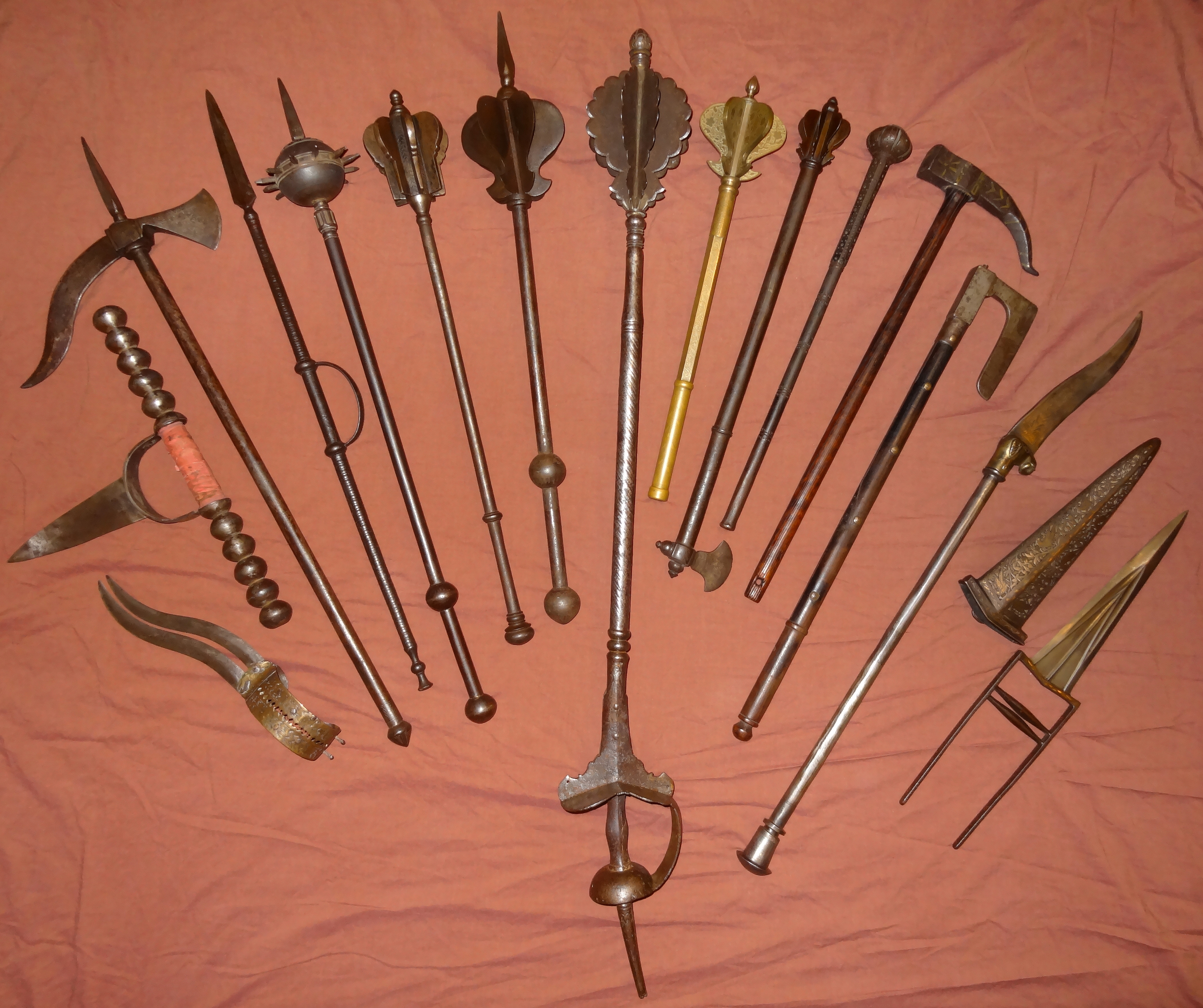
Various staff weapons invented by the Indo-Persian to equip foot soldiers. The fourth spear-like object with the loop handguard from the left is a saintie.

The saintie is an Indo-Persian parrying spear. It is a staff weapon that can be used both for offensive and defensive purposes. They have been produced since the 16th century and were used up to the 19th century. The use of saintie is extremely scarce today.

== Medieval Indo-Persian staff weapons ==
Since swords remained expensive items affordable only to affluent officers, staff weapons or polearms or even simple blades fixed to long shafts were developed as a cheaper alternative with highly effective use. Staff weapons were given for the ordinary foot soldier to equip them with powerful and effective killing tools. The Indo-Persians innovated a wide range of staff weapons e.g. iron maces, long-handled battle axes, and long shafts with pointed spearheads at the point e.g. the spear-like saintie.

Staff weapons may have evolved from agricultural implements or from simple clubs. They could be as effective as swords in face-to-face combat. Following the gunpowder revolution, the staff weapons were gradually rendered obsolete. Despite the condition, many staff weapons remained in use and the shape is virtually unaltered up. Some Asian armies in the 18th century and even in the 19th century still use staff weapons in a battle.

== Use ==
The saintie is used as a parrying weapon. It is a versatile weapon with both defensive and offensive function. The shaft, with its ribbed or ringed design, could be used like a staff to deflect hostile blows. The spear point was thickened to allow an offensive thrust to penetrate the enemy's thick clothing or armor.

== Form ==
Saintie usually measures between 26.75 inches (67.9 cm) to 35 inches (89 cm). The saintie is an all steel or all iron weapon. It consists of a spearhead and a ribbed shaft. The spear blade is thickened and may be serrated to help penetrate stronger armor. The shaft is similarly made of steel or iron and is designed with ribbed hafts or with ring-like features that goes along the length; this is used for parrying swords and other weapons. In some examples, the ribbed hafts are replaced with an intricate and complex pattern, perhaps indicating that the owner of the saintie was an affluent officer or the saintie is merely a display object. Some saintie are found with a thin layer of gold and silver.

The center of the shaft is usually smooth, designed to be strongly gripped. A loop handguard made of strong iron is attached to the center of the shaft to protect the hand. This iron handguard is often elaborately shaped, despite its protective use as knucklebow. Sometimes there's a second spear point placed on the iron handguard. The bottom end of the saintie has a kind of finial, which is used to deliver non-lethal blow to the enemy.

The shaft of the saintie sometimes concealed another dagger.

== Cited works ==
- Gahir, Sunita; Spencer, Sharon, eds. (2006). Weapon - A Visual History of Arms and Armor. New York City: DK Publishing. ISBN 9780756622107.
- Stone, George Cameron (2013). A Glossary of the Construction, Decoration and Use of Arms and Armor: in All Countries and in All Times. Dover: Courier Corporation. ISBN 9780486131290.
